Borok is a rural locality (a village) in Borisoglebskoye Rural Settlement, Muromsky District, Vladimir Oblast, Russia. The population was 24 as of 2010.

Geography 
Borok is located 48 km northeast of Murom (the district's administrative centre) by road. Poltso is the nearest rural locality.

References 

Rural localities in Muromsky District
Muromsky Uyezd